Brassington is a civil parish in the Derbyshire Dales district of Derbyshire, England.  The parish contains 37 listed buildings that are recorded in the National Heritage List for England.  Of these, two are listed at Grade II*, the middle of the three grades, and the others are at Grade II, the lowest grade.  The parish contains the village of Brassington, the smaller settlements of Grangemill and  Longcliffe, and the surrounding countryside.  In the parish are two surviving military buildings, an observation post and a monitoring station.  The Cromford and High Peak Railway, now closed, ran through the parish, and the listed buildings associated with it are a station and a bridge.  Most of the listed buildings are houses, cottages and associated structures, farmhouses and farm buildings.  The other listed buildings include a church, a chapel, public houses, a former toll house, a milestone, and a former cheese factory.


Key

Buildings

References

Citations

Sources

 

Lists of listed buildings in Derbyshire